Stefan Mächler (born 30 May 1957 in Baden, Switzerland) is a Swiss historian and expert on antisemitism and Switzerland's treatment of Holocaust refugees during and after World War II.

Biography

Education 
Maechler studied history and German literature at the University of Zurich.

Wilkomirski affair 
He was commissioned by the Schocken Books specializing in judaica to conduct a full-scale investigation into the life of writer Binjamin Wilkomirski whose memoir Fragments, published by Schocken in 1996, sparked international controversy. Maechler studied hundreds of personal documents, and has interviewed eyewitnesses and families of survivors in seven countries. He was given unrestricted access to government files, and subsequently, discovered facts that completely refuted Wilkomirski's bestselling book as a forgery. Maechler published his findings in a book called The Wilkomirski Affair: A Study in Biographical Truth by Schocken Books, New York, in 2001 (496 pp.); originally in the German language as Der Fall Wilkomirski: über die Wahrheit einer Biographie by Pendo Verlag AG, Zurich, 2000.

Personal life 
Maechler lives and works in Zurich.

Notes

References
 Good Reads,   The Wilkomirski Affair: A Study in Biographical Truth by Stefan Maechler, John E. Woods (Translator). Good Reads: Book. Retrieved February 7, 2015.
 Alibris,  BOOKS by Stefan Maechler.  The Wilkomirski Affair: A Study in Biographical Truth 2015 Alibris for Libraries. Retrieved February 7, 2015.

20th-century Swiss historians
Swiss male writers
1957 births
Living people
21st-century Swiss historians
Writers from Zürich